Manuel Matias may refer to:
Manuel Matias (runner) (born 1962), Portuguese runner
Manuel Matias (footballer) (born 1964), Portuguese footballer